Amata annulata is a species of moth of the subfamily Arctiinae first described by Johan Christian Fabricius in 1775. It is found in Australia (Queensland, New South Wales and Victoria), New Guinea and the Philippines.

The wingspan is about 40 mm. Adults are wasp like and have black wings with yellow translucent spots.

The larvae feed on the foliage of Persicaria capitata, but also on the petals of flowers of Rosa odorata and the fruits Solanum nigrum. They are black and are covered with brown hairs. When full grown, they reach a length of about 30 mm. Pupation takes place in a brown pupa in a sparse white cocoon, made at a sheltered spot.

References 

annulata
Moths of Australia
Moths of Asia
Taxa named by Johan Christian Fabricius
Moths described in 1775